Walter Edward C. Moore (1927–1996) was an American microbiologist who was instrumental in founding The Anaerobe Lab at Virginia Tech.  The Anaerobe Lab was built in 1970 and was a world leader in developing techniques to grow anaerobic bacteria in culture.  With other faculty members he co-wrote the Anaerobe Manual.

References

External links
 Research Gate https://www.researchgate.net/scientific-contributions/2071703941_W_E_C_Moore
 Virginia Tech History: Building Chronology. http://www.unirel.vt.edu/history/physical_plant/building_chronology.html
 Anaerobe laboratory manual : by the staff of the Anaerobe Laboratory, Virginia Polytechnic Institute and State University ... / ed. by Lillian V. Holdeman and W. E. C. Moore. Virginia Polytechnic Institute. Anaerobe Laboratory. 2nd ed. Blacksburg, Va. : V.P.I. Anaerobe Laboratory, 1973.

1927 births
1996 deaths
American microbiologists
Virginia Tech faculty